The 2009 Individual Speedway Polish Championship was the 2009 version of Individual Speedway Polish Championship organized by the Polish Motor Union (PZM). The defending Champion esd Adam Skórnicki, who finished sixth. The Final took place on 25 July 2009 at MotoArena Toruń in Toruń. The Final was won by Tomasz Gollob, who beat Krzysztof Kasprzak and Janusz Kołodziej. It was eight title for Gollob.

Quarter-finals

Semi-finals 

2009 Speedway Grand Prix permanent riders and the top 8 riders from 2008 Individual Polish Championship Final are expected to participate in the semi-finals:
 Tomasz Gollob (GP #3 and 4th place in 2008 Final)
 Rune Holta (#8)
 Grzegorz Walasek (#13 and 3rd)
 Sebastian Ułamek (#14)
 Adam Skórnicki (1st)
 Jarosław Hampel (2nd)
 Damian Baliński (5th)
 Krzysztof Kasprzak (6th)
 Piotr Protasiewicz (7th)
 Robert Kościecha (8th)

Final 

 The Final
 25 July 2009 (19:30 UTC+2)
 Toruń, MotoArena Toruń
 Referee: Jerzy Najwer
 Attendance: 12,500
 Beat time: 58,06 - Wiesław Jaguś in Heat 6

Riders

Heat details

Heat after heat 
 (59,06) Jeleniewski, Jabłoński, Miedziński, Ząbik
 (59,34) Gomólski, Baliński, Szczepaniak, Jaguś
 (58,59) Gollob, Kołodziej, Kasprzak, Walasek
 (59,16) Skórnicki, Protasiewicz, Kuciapa, Świderski
 (59,09) Skórnicki, Jabłoński, Walasek, Gomólski (Fx)
 (58,06) Jaguś, Protasiewicz, Gollob, Ząbik
 (59,31) Miedziński, Kołodziej, Kuciapa, Baliński (Fx)
 (59,28) Kasprzak, Jeleniewski, Szczepaniak, Świderski (e3)
 (59,10) Jaguś, Kołodziej, Świderski, Jabłoński
 (59,54) Kasprzak, Ząbik, Gomólski, Kuciapa
 (59,36) Walasek, Protasiewicz, Miedziński, Szczepaniak
 (60,09) Gollob, Skórnicki, Baliński, Jeleniewski
 (59,91) Kasprzak, Jabłoński, Baliński, Protasiewicz
 (60,72) Kołodziej, Skórnicki, Szczepaniak, Ząbik (Fx)
 (60,06) Gollob, Miedziński, Świderski, Gomólski
 (60,59) Walasek, Jaguś, Kuciapa, Jeleniewski
 (60,37) Gollob, Jabłoński, Szczepaniak, Kuciapa
 (59,69) Walasek, Świderski, Musielak (Baliński F/-), Ząbik (Fx)
 (60,63) Miedziński, Jaguś, Kasprzak, Skórnicki
 (60,31) Protasiewicz, Kołodziej, Gomólski, Jeleniewski (e4)
 Silver-bronze medal Run-Off:
 (59,32) Kasprzak, Kołodziej

See also 
 2009 Team Speedway Polish Championship (2009 Speedway Ekstraliga)
 2009 Individual Speedway Junior Polish Championship
 2009 Golden Helmet (Poland)

References 

2009
Individual